Southern Democrats are affiliates of the U.S. Democratic Party who reside in the Southern United States. Most of them voted against the Civil Rights Act of 1964 by holding the longest filibuster in American Senate history while Democrats in non-Southern states supported the Civil Rights Act of 1964. After 1994 the Republicans typically won most elections in the South.

Before the American Civil War, Southern Democrats were mostly White men living in the South who believed in Jacksonian democracy. In the 19th century, they defended slavery in the United States, and promoted its expansion into the West against northern Free Soil opposition. The United States presidential election of 1860 formalized the split in the Democratic Party and brought about the American Civil War. Stephen Douglas was the candidate for the Northern Democratic Party, and John C. Breckinridge represented the Southern Democratic Party. Abraham Lincoln, who opposed slavery, was the Republican Party candidate. After Reconstruction ended in the late 1870s so-called redeemers controlled all the Southern states and disenfranchised Blacks. The "Solid South" gave nearly all its electoral votes to the Democrats in presidential elections. Republicans seldom were elected to office outside some Appalachian mountain districts and a few heavily German-American counties of Texas.

After American women gained the de jure right to vote after the 19th amendment in 1920, the Solid South began to show some cracks during the Roaring Twenties, but the monopoly that the Democratic Party held over most of the South only first showed major signs of breaking apart in 1948; many White Southern Democrats, upset by the policies of desegregation enacted during the administration of Democratic President Harry Truman, created the States Rights Democratic Party. This new party, commonly referred to as the "Dixiecrats", nominated South Carolina Governor Strom Thurmond for president. The Dixiecrats won most of the deep South, where Truman was not on the ballot. The new party collapsed after Truman still won the election, and Thurmond became a Republican in the 1960s.

President Lyndon B. Johnson, although a southern Democrat himself, signed the Civil Rights Act of 1964 and Voting Rights Act of 1965. The evening after signing the Civil Rights Act, Johnson told aide Bill Moyers, "I think we may have lost the south for your lifetime – and mine", anticipating a coming backlash from Southern whites against Johnson's Democratic Party. As Johnson anticipated, this led to heavy opposition from Southern Democrats. However, the Democratic Party had a supermajority in the Senate with 46 of their members joining the Republican Party by voting for, while 21, all conservative Democrats voted against. Subsequent to the passage of civil rights legislation, many White southerners switched to the Republican Party at the national level. Many scholars have said that Southern whites shifted to the Republican Party due to racial conservatism. Many continued to vote for Democrats at the state and local levels, especially before the Republican Revolution of 1994.

By the 21st century and especially after the 2010 midterm elections, the GOP gained a solid advantage over the Democratic Party in most Southern states. In 2016, Republican candidate Donald Trump won a majority of the vote in Elliott County, Kentucky, the first time that it had ever voted for a Republican presidential candidate since its establishment in the 19th century. In 2020, Democrat Joe Biden narrowly won Georgia, the first time since 1992 that Georgia voted for a Democratic presidential candidate, though Republicans maintained their state government "trifecta"  (including in the 2022 midterms). Noted modern-day Southern Democrats include Kentucky governor Andy Beshear, Louisiana governor John Bel Edwards, North Carolina governor Roy Cooper, Virginia's U.S. Senators Mark Warner and Tim Kaine, Georgia's U.S. Senators Raphael Warnock and Jon Ossoff, and West Virginia's U.S. Senator Joe Manchin.

History

1828–1861

The title of "Democrat" has its beginnings in the South, going back to the founding of the Democratic-Republican Party in 1793 by Thomas Jefferson and James Madison. It held to small government principles and distrusted the national government. Foreign policy was a major issue. After being the dominant party in U.S. politics from 1801 to 1829, the Democratic-Republicans split into two factions by 1828: the federalist National Republicans, and the Democrats. The Democrats and Whigs were evenly balanced in the 1830s and 1840s. However, by the 1850s, the Whigs disintegrated. Other opposition parties emerged but the Democrats were dominant. Northern Democrats were in serious opposition to Southern Democrats on the issue of slavery; Northern Democrats, led by Stephen Douglas, believed in Popular Sovereignty—letting the people of the territories vote on slavery. The Southern Democrats, reflecting the views of the late John C. Calhoun, insisted slavery was national.

The Democrats controlled the national government from 1853 until 1861, and Presidents Pierce and Buchanan were friendly to Southern interests. In the North, the newly formed anti-slavery Republican Party came to power and dominated the electoral college. In the 1860 presidential election, the Republicans nominated Abraham Lincoln, but the divide among Democrats led to the nomination of two candidates: John C. Breckinridge of Kentucky represented Southern Democrats, and Stephen A. Douglas of Illinois represented Northern Democrats. Nevertheless, the Republicans had a majority of the electoral vote regardless of how the opposition split or joined and Abraham Lincoln was elected.

1861–1933
After the election of Abraham Lincoln, Southern Democrats led the charge to secede from the Union and establish the Confederate States. The United States Congress was dominated by Republicans, save for Andrew Johnson of Tennessee, the only senator from a state in rebellion to reject secession. The Border States of Kentucky, Maryland, and Missouri were torn by political turmoil. Kentucky and Missouri were both governed by pro-secessionist Southern Democratic Governors who vehemently rejected Lincoln's call for 75,000 troops. Kentucky and Missouri both held secession conventions, but neither officially declared secession. Southern Democrats in Maryland faced a Unionist Governor Thomas Holliday Hicks and the Union Army. Armed with the suspension of habeas corpus and Union troops, Governor Hicks was able to stop Maryland's secession movement. Maryland was the only state south of the Mason–Dixon line whose governor affirmed Lincoln's call for 75,000 troops.

After secession, the Democratic vote in the North split between the War Democrats and the Peace Democrats or "Copperheads". The War Democrats voted for Lincoln in the 1864 election, and Lincoln had a War Democrat — Andrew Johnson — on his ticket. In the South, during Reconstruction the white Republican element, called "Scalawags" became smaller and smaller as more and more joined the Democrats. In the North, most War Democrats returned to the Democrats, and when the "Panic of 1873" hit, the GOP was blamed and the Democrats gained control of the House of Representatives in 1875. The Democrats emphasized that since Jefferson and Jackson they had been the party of states rights, which added to their appeal in the white South.

At the beginning of the 20th century the Democrats, led by the dominant Southern wing, had a strong representation in Congress. They won both houses in 1912 and elected Woodrow Wilson, a New Jersey academic with deep Southern roots and a strong base among the Southern middle class. The GOP regained Congress in 1919.

From 1896 to 1912 and 1921 to 1931, the Democrats were relegated to second place status in national politics and didn't control a single branch of the federal government despite universal dominance in most of the "Solid South." In 1928 several Southern states dallied with voting Republican in supporting Herbert Hoover over the Roman Catholic Al Smith, but the behavior was short lived as the Stock Market Crash of 1929 returned Republicans to disfavor throughout the South. Nationally, Republicans lost Congress in January 1931 and the White House in March 1933 by huge margins. By this time, too, the Democratic Party leadership began to change its tone somewhat on racial politics. With the Great Depression gripping the nation, and with the lives of most Americans disrupted, the assisting of African-Americans in American society was seen as necessary by the new government.

1933–1981
During the 1930s, as the New Deal began to move Democrats as a whole to the left in economic policy, Southern Democrats were mostly supportive, although by the late 1930s there was a growing conservative faction. Both factions supported Roosevelt's foreign policies. By 1948 the protection of segregation led Democrats in the Deep South to reject Truman and run a third party ticket of Dixiecrats in the 1948 election. After 1964, Southern Democrats lost major battles during the Civil Rights Movement. Federal laws ended segregation and restrictions on black voters.

During the Civil Rights Movement, Democrats in the South initially still voted loyally with their party. After the signing of the Civil Rights Act of 1964, the old argument that all whites had to stick together to prevent civil rights legislation lost its force because the legislation had now been passed. More and more whites began to vote Republican, especially in the suburbs and growing cities. Newcomers from the North were mostly Republican; they were now joined by conservatives and wealthy Southern whites, while liberal whites and poor whites, especially in rural areas, remained with the Democratic Party.

The New Deal program of Franklin Delano Roosevelt (FDR) generally united the party factions for over three decades, since Southerners, like Northern urban populations, were hit particularly hard and generally benefited from the massive governmental relief program. FDR was adept at holding white Southerners in the coalition while simultaneously beginning the erosion of Black voters away from their then-characteristic Republican preferences. The Civil Rights Movement of the 1960s catalyzed the end of this Democratic Party coalition of interests by magnetizing Black voters to the Democratic label and simultaneously ending White control of the Democratic Party apparatus. A series of court decisions, rendering primary elections as public instead of private events administered by the parties, essentially freed the Southern region to change more toward the two-party behavior of most of the rest of the nation.

In the presidential elections of 1952 and 1956 Republican nominee Dwight D. Eisenhower, a popular World War II general, won several Southern states, thus breaking some white Southerners away from their Democratic Party pattern. The passage of the Civil Rights Act of 1964 was a significant event in converting the Deep South to the Republican Party; in that year most Senatorial Republicans supported the Act (most of the opposition came from Southern Democrats). From the end of the Civil War to 1961 Democrats had solid control over the southern states on the national level, hence the term "Solid South" to describe the states' Democratic preference. After the passage of this Act, however, their willingness to support Republicans on a national level increased demonstrably. In 1964, Republican presidential nominee Goldwater, who had voted against the Civil Rights Act, won many of the "Solid South" states over Democratic presidential nominee Lyndon B. Johnson, himself a Texan, and with many this Republican support continued and seeped down the ballot to congressional, state, and ultimately local levels. A further significant item of legislation was the Voting Rights Act of 1965, which targeted for preclearance by the U.S. Department of Justice any election-law change in areas where African-American voting participation was lower than the norm (most but not all of these areas were in the South); the effect of the Voting Rights Act on southern elections was profound, including the by-product that some White Southerners perceived it as meddling while Black voters universally appreciated it. Nixon aid Kevin Phillips told the New York Times in 1970 that "Negrophobe" whites would quit the Democrats if Republicans enforced the Voting Rights Act and blacks registered as Democrats. The trend toward acceptance of Republican identification among Southern White voters was bolstered in the next two elections by Richard Nixon.

Denouncing the forced busing policy that was used to enforce school desegregation, Richard Nixon courted populist conservative Southern whites with what is called the Southern Strategy, though his speechwriter Jeffrey Hart claimed that his campaign rhetoric was actually a "Border State Strategy" and accused the press of being "very lazy" when they called it a "Southern Strategy". In the 1971 Swann v. Charlotte-Mecklenburg Board of Education ruling, the power of the federal government to enforce forced busing was strengthened when the Supreme Court ruled that the federal courts had the discretion to include busing as a desegregation tool to achieve racial balance. Some southern Democrats became Republicans at the national level, while remaining with their old party in state and local politics throughout the 1970s and 1980s. Several prominent conservative Democrats switched parties to become Republicans, including Strom Thurmond, John Connally and Mills E. Godwin Jr. In the 1974 Milliken v. Bradley decision, however, the ability to use forced busing as a political tactic was greatly diminished when the U.S. Supreme Court placed an important limitation on Swann and ruled that students could only be bused across district lines if evidence of de jure segregation across multiple school districts existed.

In 1976, former Georgia governor Jimmy Carter won every Southern state except Oklahoma and Virginia in his successful presidential campaign as a Democrat. In 1980 Republican presidential nominee Ronald Reagan won every southern state except for Georgia, although Alabama, Mississippi, South Carolina, Arkansas, North Carolina and Tennessee were all decided by less than 3%.

1981–2008
In 1980, Republican presidential nominee Ronald Reagan announced that he supported states' rights. Lee Atwater, who served as Reagan's chief strategist in the Southern states, claimed that by 1968, a vast majority of southern whites had learned to accept that racial slurs like "nigger" were offensive and that mentioning "states rights" and reasons for its justification had now become the best way to appeal to southern white voters. Following Reagan's success at the national level, the Republican Party moved sharply to the right, with the shrinkage of the liberal Rockefeller Republican element that had emphasized their support for civil rights.

Economic and cultural conservatism (especially regarding abortion and LGBT rights) became more important in the South, with its large religious right element, such as Southern Baptists in the Bible Belt. The South gradually became fertile ground for the Republican Party. Following the Civil Rights movement, the large black vote in the South held steady more or less but favored overwhelmingly the Democratic Party. Even as the Southern Democratic party came to increasingly depend on the support of African-American voters, well-established white Democratic incumbents still held sway in most Southern states. Starting in 1964, although the Southern states split their support between parties in most presidential elections, conservative Democrats controlled nearly every Southern state legislature until the mid-1990s. Not until 2011 did the Republicans capture a majority of Southern state legislatures, and have continued to hold power over Southern politics for the most part since. On the eve of the Republican Revolution in 1994, Democrats still held a 2:1 advantage over the Republicans in southern congressional seats.

Republicans first dominated presidential elections in the South, then controlled Southern gubernatorial and congressional elections after the 1994 Republican Revolution, then won control of many state legislatures, and then came to dominate the South by the 2010s. As of the 2020s, Southern Democrats who consistently vote for the Democratic ticket are mostly urban liberals or African Americans, while most White Southerners of both genders tend to vote for the Republican ticket, although there are sizable numbers of swing voters who sometimes split their tickets or cross party lines.

Many of the Representatives, Senators, and voters who were referred to as Reagan Democrats in the 1980s were conservative Southern Democrats. But there were or are notable exceptions to the Solid South in the 21st century.

 One exception was Arkansas, whose state legislature continued to be majority Democrat (having, however, given its electoral votes to the Republicans in the past three presidential elections, except in 1992 and 1996 when "favorite son" Bill Clinton was the candidate and won each time) until 2012, when Arkansas voters selected a 21–14 Republican majority in the Arkansas Senate.

 Another exception is North Carolina. Despite the fact that the state has voted for Republicans in every presidential election from 1980 until 2004 the governorship (until 2012), legislature (until 2010), as well as most statewide offices, it remains in Democratic control. The North Carolina congressional delegation was heavily Democratic until January 2013 when the Republicans could, after the 2010 United States census, adopt a redistricting plan of their choosing. The incumbent governor is Roy Cooper, a Democrat.

 Dr. Ralph Northam, a Democrat and the governor of Virginia (2018–22) has admitted that he voted for George W. Bush in the 2000 and 2004 presidential elections. Despite this admission, Northam, a former state Senator who has served as Lieutenant Governor of Virginia from 2014 to 2018, easily defeated the more progressive candidate, former Representative Tom Perriello, by 55.9 percent to 44.1 percent to win the Democratic gubernatorial nomination in 2017.

In 1992, Arkansas Governor Bill Clinton was elected president. Unlike Carter, however, Clinton was only able to win the southern states of Arkansas, Louisiana, Kentucky, Tennessee and Georgia. While running for president, Clinton promised to "end welfare as we have come to know it" while in office. In 1996, Clinton would fulfill his campaign promise and the longtime Republican goal of major welfare reform came into fruition. After two welfare reform bills sponsored by the Republican-controlled Congress were successfully vetoed by the President, a compromise was eventually reached and the Personal Responsibility and Work Opportunity Act was signed into law on August 22, 1996.

During the Clinton administration, the southern strategy shifted towards the so-called "culture war," which saw major political battles between the Religious Right and the secular Left. Chapman notes a split vote among many conservative Southern Democrats in the 1970s and 1980s who supported local and statewide conservative Democrats while simultaneously voting for Republican presidential candidates. This tendency of many Southern whites to vote for the Republican presidential candidate but Democrats from other offices lasted until the 2010 midterm elections. In the November 2008 elections, Democrats won 3 out of 4 U.S. House seats from Mississippi, 3 out of 4 in Arkansas, 5 out of 9 in Tennessee, and achieved near parity in the Georgia and Alabama delegations.

2009–present
In 2009, Southern Democrats controlled both branches of the Alabama General Assembly, the Arkansas General Assembly, the Delaware General Assembly, the Louisiana State Legislature, the Maryland General Assembly, the Mississippi Legislature, the North Carolina General Assembly, and the West Virginia Legislature, along with the Council of the District of Columbia, the Kentucky House of Representatives, and the Virginia Senate. Democrats lost control of the North Carolina and Alabama legislatures in 2010, the Louisiana and Mississippi legislatures in 2011 and the Arkansas legislature in 2012. Additionally, in 2014, Democrats lost four U.S. Senate seats in the South (in West Virginia, North Carolina, Arkansas, and Louisiana) that they had previously held. By 2017, Southern Democrats only controlled both branches of the Delaware General Assembly and the Maryland General Assembly, along with the Council of the District of Columbia; they had lost control of both houses of the state legislatures in Alabama, Arkansas, Louisiana, Mississippi, North Carolina, and West Virginia.

Nearly all white Democratic representatives in the South lost reelection in the 2010 midterm elections. That year, Democrats won only one U.S. House seat each in Alabama, Mississippi, Louisiana, South Carolina, and Arkansas, and two out of nine House seats in Tennessee, and they lost their one Arkansas seat in 2012. Following the November 2010 elections, John Barrow of Georgia was left as the only one white Democratic U.S. House member in the Deep South, and he lost reelection in 2014. There would no more white Democrats from the Deep South until Joe Cunningham was elected from a South Carolina U.S. House district in 2018, and he lost re-election in 2020. 

However, even since January 2013, Democrats have not been completely shut out of power in the South. Democrat John Bel Edwards was elected governor of Louisiana in 2015, running as an anti-abortion, pro-gun conservative Democrat. In 2017, moderate Democrat Doug Jones was elected senator from Alabama in a special election, breaking the Democratic losing streak in Alabama. 2019 saw some additional successes for Southern Democrats, as they won control of both houses of the Virginia Legislature, Andy Beshear was elected governor of Kentucky, narrowly defeating Republican incumbent Matt Bevin, and Edwards won reelection in Louisiana.

Presently, most of the U.S. House or state legislative seats held by Democrats in the South are based in majority-minority or urban districts. Due to growing urbanization and changing demographics in many Southern states, more liberal Democrats have found success in the South. In the 2018 elections, Democrats nearly succeeded in taking governor's seats in Georgia and Florida, won 12 national House seats in the South and performed well in Senate races in Texas and Florida; the trend continued in the 2019 elections, where Democrats took both houses of the Virginia General Assembly, and in 2020 where Joe Biden (a former Senator from Delaware, classified as a Southern state by the Census Bureau) narrowly won Georgia with Republicans winning down ballot, along with Raphael Warnock and Jon Ossoff narrowly winning both Senate seats in that state just two months later. However, Democrats would lose the governor races in Florida and Georgia in 2022 by wider margins than in 2018, though Senator Warnock won re-election in Georgia.

Election results

Noted Southern Democrats
Individuals are organized in sections by chronological (century they died or are still alive) order and then alphabetical order (last name then first name) within sections. Current or former U.S. Presidents or Vice Presidents have their own section that begins first, but not former Confederate States Presidents or Vice Presidents. Also, incumbent federal or state officeholders begin second.

Southern Democrat U.S. Presidents and Vice Presidents
 Alben Barkley, Representative, U.S. Senator from Kentucky and U.S. Vice President
 Joe Biden, U.S. Senator from Delaware and President of the United States (2021–present)
 Jimmy Carter, Governor of Georgia and President of the United States (1977–1981)
 Bill Clinton, Governor of Arkansas and President of the United States (1993–2001)
 Al Gore, Representative and U.S. Senator from Tennessee, Vice President of the United States (1993–2001) and 2000 Democratic nominee for President
 Lyndon B. Johnson, U.S. Representative and senator from Texas, Vice President of the United States (1961–1963), and President of the United States (1963–1969)

Incumbent Southern Democrat Elected Officeholders
 Roy Cooper, incumbent governor of North Carolina
 John Bel Edwards, incumbent governor of Louisiana
 Tim Kaine, Governor of Virginia, Chairman of the DNC, incumbent U.S. Senator from Virginia, also the 2016 Democratic Vice Presidential nominee
 Joseph Manchin III, governor of West Virginia, incumbent U.S. Senator from West Virginia, and Southern Governors' Association chairman
 Ralph Northam, Governor of Virginia
Raphael Warnock, current U.S. Senator from Georgia
Jon Ossoff, current U.S. Senator from Georgia

19th Century Southern Democrats
 Jefferson Davis, Representative and U.S. Senator from Mississippi, President of Confederacy

20th Century Southern Democrats
 Ross Barnett, governor of Mississippi 
 James F. Byrnes, U.S. Secretary of State, Associate Justice of the U.S. Supreme Court, Representative, U.S. Senator, Governor of South Carolina
 A.B. "Happy" Chandler, governor and senator from Kentucky
 Lawton Chiles, U.S. Senator from Florida and Governor of Florida
James O. Eastland, U.S. Senator from Mississippi
 Sam Ervin, U.S. Senator from North Carolina from 1954 to 1974
 J. William Fulbright, Representative from Arkansas, U.S. Senator from Arkansas and longest-served chairman of the Senate Foreign Relations Committee
 Howell Heflin, senator from Alabama
 Spessard Holland, U.S. Senator from Florida and Governor of Florida
 Olin D. Johnston, U.S. Senator from South Carolina and Governor of South Carolina
 Estes Kefauver, Representative, U.S. Senator from Tennessee and 1956 Democratic vice presidential nominee
 Earl Long, three-term Louisiana governor
 Huey P. Long, Louisiana governor and U.S. Senator
 John McClellan, Representative and U.S. Senator from Arkansas
 Lawrence Patton McDonald, Former Representative from Georgia
 Sam Rayburn, Congressman from Texas and longest-served Speaker of the U.S. House of Representatives-longest served in the House's history
 Terry Sanford, U.S. Senator and governor from North Carolina
 John Stennis, U.S. Senator from Mississippi
 Benjamin Tillman, governor and senator of South Carolina
 George C. Wallace, governor of Alabama, American Independent Party candidate for president in 1968, ran for the Democratic presidential nomination in 1972 and 1976
 Ralph Yarborough, U.S. Senator from Texas

21st Century Southern Democrats (Deceased)
 Reubin Askew, Governor of Florida and 1984 U.S. presidential candidate
 Lloyd Bentsen, Representative and U.S. Senator from Texas, Secretary of the Treasury, and Democratic candidate for vice president in 1988
 Kathleen Blanco, Governor of Louisiana
Dale Bumpers, U.S. Senator from Arkansas and Governor of Arkansas
 Robert Byrd, Representative, U.S. Senator from West Virginia, presidential candidate, 1976
 Edwin Edwards, Representative and Governor of Louisiana
 Wendell Ford, governor and senator from Kentucky
 Kay Hagan, U.S. Senator from North Carolina
 Fritz Hollings, U.S. Senator from South Carolina, Governor of South Carolina, 1984 U.S. presidential candidate
 John Lewis, U.S. Representative from Georgia and civil rights leader
 Lester Maddox, governor of Georgia
 Zell B. Miller, U.S. Senator from Georgia and Georgia governor
 J. Strom Thurmond, U.S. Senator from South Carolina and Governor of South Carolina (Democrat until 1964, then Republican until death), States' Right candidate (Dixiecrat) for president in 1948

21st Century Southern Democrats (Living)
 Roy Barnes, Governor of Georgia
 John Barrow, U.S. Representative from Georgia
 Mike Beebe, Governor of Arkansas
 Steve Beshear, Governor of Kentucky
 John Breaux, Representative and U.S. Senator from Louisiana
 Phil Bredesen, Governor of Tennessee
 Ben Chandler, Attorney General of Kentucky and Congressman from Kentucky
 Travis Childers, U.S. representative from Mississippi
 Max Cleland, U.S. Senator from Georgia
 Martha Layne Collins, Governor of Kentucky and chair of the 1984 Democratic National Convention
 John R. Edwards, U.S. Senator from North Carolina, 2004 Democratic vice presidential nominee, Democratic presidential candidate in 2004 and 2008.
 D. Robert Graham, U.S. Senator from Florida and Governor of Florida
 James Hovis Hodges, Governor of South Carolina
 J. Bennett Johnston, U.S. Senator from Louisiana
 Doug Jones, former U.S. Senator from Alabama
 Mary Landrieu, former U.S. Senator from Louisiana
 Blanche Lincoln, Representative and U.S. Senator from Arkansas
 Martin O'Malley, Governor of Maryland
 Bill Nelson, Representative, U.S. Senator from Florida
 Sam Nunn, U.S. Senator from Georgia
 Paul Patton, Governor of Kentucky
 Bev Perdue, 73rd Governor of North Carolina
 Sonny Perdue, Governor of Georgia (was once a Democrat, now Republican)
 David Pryor, Representative, U.S. Senator from Arkansas and Governor of Arkansas
 Mark Pryor, U.S. Senator from Arkansas
 Richard Shelby, former U.S. Representative and U.S. Senator from Alabama who was initially a Democrat, then became a Republican since 1994.
 Jim Webb, U.S. Senator from Virginia and Secretary of the Navy, 2016 Democratic presidential candidate (once a Republican)
 Douglas Wilder, Virginia governor, first African-American ever elected governor in the U.S., tried to go for the Democratic presidential nomination in 1991, but eventually withdrew in 1992

Southern Democratic presidential tickets
At various times, registered Democrats from the South broke with the national party to nominate their own presidential and vice presidential candidates, generally in opposition to civil rights measures supported by the national nominees. There was at least one Southern Democratic effort in every presidential election from 1944 until 1968, besides 1952. On some occasions, such as in 1948 with Strom Thurmond, these candidates have been listed on the ballot in some states as the nominee of the Democratic Party. George Wallace of Alabama was in presidential politics as a conservative Democrat except 1968, when he left the party and ran as an independent. Running as the nominees of the American Independent Party, the Wallace ticket won 5 states. Its best result was in Alabama, where it received 65.9% of the vote. Wallace was the official Democratic nominee in Alabama and Hubert Humphrey was listed as the "National Democratic" candidate.

See also

 Blue Dog Democrats
 Boll weevil (politics)
 Bourbon Democrat
 Conservative Democrat
 Democrat In Name Only
 Democratic Party history
 Jeffersonian democracy
 Democratic Leadership Council
 Democratic Party
 Ku Klux Klan
 National Democratic Party
 New Democrats
 Rockefeller Republican
 Yellow dog Democrats
 Solid South
 Straight-Out Democratic Party

Notes

South of the Mason–Dixon line Carter won just 34 electoral votes – his own Georgia, plus Delaware, Maryland, and District of Columbia.

References

Further reading
 Barone, Michael, and others. The Almanac of American Politics 1976: The Senators, the Representatives and the Governors: Their Records and Election Results, Their States and Districts (1975–2017); new edition every 2 years; detailed political profile of every governor and member of Congress, as well as state and district politics
 Bateman, David, Ira Katznelson and John S. Lapinski. (2020). Southern Nation: Congress and white supremacy after reconstruction. Princeton University Press.
 Black, Earl and Merle Black. Politics and Society in the South (1989)
 Bullock III, Charles S. and Mark J. Rozell, eds. The Oxford Handbook of Southern Politics (2012)
 Bullock, Charles S.; MacManus, Susan A.; Mayer, Jeremy D.; Rozell, Mark J. (2019). The South and the Transformation of U.S. Politics. Oxford University Press.
 Glaser, James M. The Hand of the Past in Contemporary Southern Politics (2013)
 Key, V. O. Southern Politics in State and Nation (1951), famous classic
 Kuziemko, Ilyana, and Ebonya Washington. "Why did the Democrats lose the south? Bringing new data to an old debate" ( No. w21703. National Bureau of Economic Research, 2015.) online
 Rae, Nicol C. Southern Democrats (Oxford University Press, 1994)
 Richter, William L. Historical Dictionary of the Old South (2005)
 Shafer, Byron E. The End of Southern Exceptionalism: Class, Race, and Partisan Change in the Postwar South (2006) excerpt and text search
 Twyman, Robert W. and David C. Roller, eds. Encyclopedia of Southern History LSU Press (1979).
 Woodard, J. David. The New Southern Politics (2006)

Democratic Party (United States)
Politics of the Southern United States
Political terminology of the United States
Factions in the Democratic Party (United States)
Dixiecrats